Rwindi Airport  is an airport serving the town of Rwindi in Nord-Kivu Province, Democratic Republic of the Congo.

See also

 Transport in the Democratic Republic of the Congo
 List of airports in the Democratic Republic of the Congo

References

External links
 HERE Maps - Rwindi
 OpenStreetMap - Rwindi
 OurAirports - Rwindi
 FallingRain - Rwindi

Airports in North Kivu